Rabbit fever  may refer to:

 Rabbit Fever (film), a documentary about the National Rabbit Show circuit
 Tularemia, a disease
 Rabbit hemorrhagic disease virus (RHDV), a disease

Bacterium-related cutaneous conditions